Mary Hicks may refer to:

Mary W. Hicks, professor emerita at Florida State University
Mary Hicks (witch) (died 1716), thought to be the last person executed in England for witchcraft
Mary Dana Hicks (1836–1927), American art educator